Stewart Peak may refer to:

 Stewart Peak (Alaska)
 Stewart Peak (Antarctica)
 Stewart Peak (British Columbia)
 Stewart Peak (Colorado)
 Stewart Peak (New Mexico)
 Stewart Peak (Wyoming)